Stephen M. Casey (born September 12, 1968) is an American politician and a Democratic member of the Rhode Island House of Representatives representing District 50 since January 1, 2013.

Education
Casey earned his bachelor's degree in communications from Boston College.

Elections
2012 Casey challenged District 50 incumbent Democratic Representative Jon D. Brien in the September 11, 2012 Democratic Primary, winning by 52 votes with 722 votes (51.9%) and was unopposed for the November 6, 2012 General election, winning with 2,749 votes.

References

External links
Official page at the Rhode Island General Assembly

Stephen Casey at Ballotpedia
Stephen M. Casey at OpenSecrets

Place of birth missing (living people)
1968 births
Living people
American firefighters
Boston College alumni
Democratic Party members of the Rhode Island House of Representatives
People from Woonsocket, Rhode Island
21st-century American politicians